"When You Close Your Eyes" is a song by American rock band Night Ranger from their 1983 album Midnight Madness.

In the U.S., the single reached number 14 on the Billboard Hot 100 and number 7 on the Billboard Hot Mainstream Rock Tracks chart.
Ultimate Classic Rock ranked "When You Close Your Eyes" at number five on their list of Top 10 Night Ranger Songs.

Background

Singer Jack Blades sat at a piano in the recording studio and improvised some chords one day, and started spontaneously singing, "When you close your eyes, do you dream about me?" He showed it to Harry Maslin, co-owner of the studio, who was impressed and urged him to keep working on the song. Blades worked out the music with the rest of the band, but they were stuck on the lyrics, and it was distracting trying to write in Hollywood. So Blades flew to his parents' home in Scottsdale, Arizona, and sat by their pool for three days, writing lyrics to "When You Close Your Eyes" and a few other songs.  Blades said,

Music video
In the music video, scenes of the band performing are interspersed with a man's memories of his ex-girlfriend, and scenes showing her current situation, a housewife married to a chimpanzee.

Track listing

Personnel
 Jack Blades – bass, lead vocals (verses)
Alan Fitzgerald – keyboards
 Brad Gillis – guitars, vocals
 Kelly Keagy – drums, lead vocals (b-sections)
 Jeff Watson – guitars, vocals

Charts

Weekly charts

Year-end charts

References

External links
Music Video

1983 songs
Night Ranger songs
1984 singles
Songs written by Jack Blades